Bjarne Schrøen (born May 24, 1918 in Trondheim - died July 5, 1991 in Trondheim), was a Norwegian bobsledder who competed in the late 1940s. At the 1948 Winter Olympics in St. Moritz, he finished tenth in the four-man event and 12th in the two-man event respectively.

References

1948 bobsleigh two-man results
1948 bobsleigh four-man results

1918 births
1991 deaths
Norwegian male bobsledders
Olympic bobsledders of Norway
Bobsledders at the 1948 Winter Olympics
Sportspeople from Trondheim